Niskabad or Neysakabad may refer to:
 Niskabad, Sardasht
 Neysakabad, Vazineh, Sardasht County